Bernd Klug (12 December 1914 – 15 June 1975) was an admiral in the West German Navy. During World War II, he served in the Kriegsmarine and was a recipient of the Knight's Cross of the Iron Cross with Oak Leaves of Nazi Germany.

Career
Klug joined Nazi Germany's Reichsmarine on 1 April 1933. He received his training aboard the school ship SSS Gorch Fock and the light cruiser Karlsruhe. Klug sailed on Karlsruhes third training cruise. Karlsruhe left Wilhelmshaven on 14 October 1933 returning to Kiel on 16 June 1934. While stationed on Karlsruhe, he advanced in rank to Gefreiter on 1 April 1934.

He was posted to the Naval Academy at Mürwik on 28 June 1934. During his vacation he was promoted to Officer Cadet on 1 July 1934. The main cadet course lasted until 18 April 1935 and was interrupted by two navigational training cruises, the first on the tender Nordsee (10–16 October 1934) and the tender Saar (31 January – 6 February 1935).

Klug led E-boats on 28 April 1944 in an attack against Convoy T-4 consisting of LSTs during the Allied large-scale rehearsals for the D-Day invasion of Normandy, dubbed Exercise Tiger. During the attack, German E-boats sank USS LST-507 and 531, and damaged 289, resulting in the deaths of 749 American servicemen.

Awards 
 Spanish Cross in Bronze without Swords (6 June 1939)
 Iron Cross (1939) 2nd Class (10 April 1940) & 1st Class (7 August 1940)
 Wound Badge (1939) in Black (25 April 1940)
 Fast Attack Craft War Badge (16 December 1940); with Diamonds (1 January 1944)
 Knight's Cross of the Iron Cross with Oak Leaves
 Knight's Cross on 12 March 1941 as Kapitänleutnant and commander of Schnellboot S-28 in the 1. Schnellbootflottille
 Oak Leaves on 1 January 1944 as chief of the 5. Schnellbootflottille
 Commanders Cross of the French Legion of Honour (1960)

References
Citation

Bibliography

External links
 

1914 births
1976 deaths
Military personnel from Wuppertal
Reichsmarine personnel
Bundesmarine admirals
Kriegsmarine personnel
German military personnel of the Spanish Civil War
Recipients of the Knight's Cross of the Iron Cross with Oak Leaves
People from the Rhine Province
Flotilla admirals of the German Navy
Grand Croix of the Légion d'honneur